Herchen station is a through station in the town of Windeck in the German state of North Rhine-Westphalia. The station was opened in 1860 on a section of the Sieg Railway, opened by the Cologne-Minden Railway Company (CME) between Eitorf and Wissen on 1 August 1861. It has two platform tracks and is classified by Deutsche Bahn as a category 5 station.

The station is served by the Rhein-Sieg-Express (RE 9), S-Bahn S 12 services from Köln-Ehrenfeld (Horrem in the peak) to Au (Sieg) and S19 services on weekdays from Düren to Herchen or Au (Sieg). The RE 9 and S12 services operate hourly, and the S19 services are less frequent.

Notes

Railway stations in North Rhine-Westphalia
Rhine-Ruhr S-Bahn stations
S12 (Rhine-Ruhr S-Bahn)
Railway stations in Germany opened in 1860
1860 establishments in Prussia
Buildings and structures in Rhein-Sieg-Kreis